Kārlis Reinholds Zariņš (born 4 December 1879, Ipiķi parish – 29 April 1963, London) (international: Charles Zarine) was envoy and consul general of Latvia in the United Kingdom. Shortly before the Soviet occupation of Latvia, on 17 May 1940 the Latvian cabinet of ministers granted Zariņš extraordinary powers. He was delegated to supervise the work of Latvia's representations abroad in time of war or other extraordinary circumstance. He served this role starting from the Soviet occupation in 1940 until his death in 1963. Since then, Arnolds Spekke and later Anatols Dinbergs represented Latvia as chargé d'affaires until restoration of independence in 1991.

Zariņš was authorized to:
 defend Latvia's interests in all countries (except Estonia, Lithuania, Finland, Sweden, Germany and the USSR);
 issue binding orders to institutions representing Latvia;
 oversee all property and handle financial resources of these institutions;
 relieve envoys of their duties;
 transfer or discharge employees of these institutions;
 close these institutions (except Latvia's Legation in the United States).

However, he never received an official order to use his powers. He only received a telegram from minister of foreign affairs Vilhelms Munters on 17 June 1940 stating: "Soviet troops are entering the country and taking control over the main institutions."

See also
 Latvian diplomatic service

References

1879 births
1963 deaths
People from Valmiera Municipality
People from Kreis Wolmar
Members of the People's Council of Latvia
Baltic diplomatic missions
Latvian expatriates in the United Kingdom